Randolph Scott (1898–1987) appeared in over 100 feature films in his career.  These films are listed below.

Feature films

Box office ranking
At the height of his career, exhibitors voted Scott among the most popular stars in the country:
1949 - 12th (US)
1950 - 10th (US)
1951 - 7th (US)
1952 - 10th (US)
1953 - 10th (US)
1954 - 22nd (US)
1955 - 22nd (US)
1956 - 24th (US)

Short films

Television

Randolph Scott's only venture into television (other than an appearance on Celebrity Golf) was in the late 1950s as the host of a proposed series entitled Randolph Scott's Theater of the West.    The episode starred Scott Brady as a lawman trying to escape a criminal past.  The series was never sold and this one and only episode was never aired.

Footnotes

Scott, Randolph
Scott, Randolph